Tyjae Spears (born June 15, 2001) is an American football running back for the Tulane Green Wave.

Early life and high school
Spears grew up in Ponchatoula, Louisiana and attended Ponchatoula High School. As a senior, he rushed for 920 yards and had 880 receiving yards with 18 total touchdowns. Spears was rated a three-star recruit and committed to play college football at Tulane after considering an offer from Kansas State.

College career
Spears rushed for 192 yards and one touchdown and caught five passes for 133 yards and one touchdown in four games during his freshman season at Tulane. He began his sophomore season as the Green Wave's starting running back and rushed 37 times for 274 yards and two touchdowns before suffering a season-ending injury in Week 3 and using a medical redshirt. As a redshirt sophomore, Spears gained 863 yards and scored nine touchdowns on 129 carries. He was named the American Athletic Conference Offensive Player of the Year as a redshirt junior.  He was ranked the 6th best college football player nationwide among the "100 Best Players of the College Football Bowl Season 2022-2023" by College Football News.

References

External links
Tulane Green Wave bio

2001 births
Living people
American football running backs
Tulane Green Wave football players
Players of American football from Louisiana
People from Ponchatoula, Louisiana